Mary Norton Kratt (born June 7, 1937) is an American author. She focuses on southern history.

Early life 
She was born in West Virginia. She attended Charlotte Central High School, Agnes Scott College and University of North Carolina at Charlotte where she received a degree in English literature.

Career 
Kratt has published seventeen books of poetry, history and biography, mostly pertaining to the Charlotte area. She swrote  two walking tours of uptown Charlotte and works closely with the Levine Museum of the New South.

Kratt served on the Speakers Bureau of the North Carolina Humanities Council.

Recognition 
She twice won the Blumenthal Writers and Readers Series. In 1994 she won the Fortner Writer In Community Award from St. Andrews College. In addition she won the Brockman/Campbell Poetry Book award.

Selected works
 Legacy the Myers Park Story 
 Charlotte, North Carolina: A Brief History 
 Southern Is... 
 Remembering Charlotte: Postcards for a New South City, 1905–1950 
 A Bird in the House; The Story of Wing Haven Garden 
 Marney 
 Charlotte: Spirit of the New South 
 My Dear Miss Eva 
 A Little Charlotte Scrapbook
 On The Steep Side
 New South Women: Twentieth Century Women of Charlotte, North Carolina 
 Small Potatoes 
 The imaginative spirit: Literary heritage of Charlotte and Mecklenburg County, North Carolina 
 The Only Thing I Fear is a Cow and a Drunken Man

References

External links 
 Mary Norton Kratt papers, J Murrey Atkins Library, UNC Charlotte

1937 births
Living people
University of North Carolina at Charlotte alumni
Writers from Charlotte, North Carolina